Do It! is the fifth album by the band Clinic, released on 7 April 2008. The single "Free Not Free" (with b-side "Thor") was made available on 1 February 2008 as a free download from clinicvoot.org. "Witch (Made to Measure)" was released as the second single in May 2008. "Tomorrow" was released as a single on 24 November.

Track listing
"Memories" – 2:37
"Tomorrow" – 3:30
"The Witch (Made to Measure)" – 3:14
"Free Not Free" – 3:03
"Shopping Bag" – 2:19
"Corpus Christi" – 3:09
"Emotions" – 2:53
"High Coin" – 3:06
"Mary and Eddie" – 2:57
"Winged Wheel" – 2:56
"Coda" – 3:18

Personnel
Ade Blackburn — Keyboard, Melodica, Lead Vocals
Brian Campbell — Bass, Flute, Backing Vocals
Hartley — Lead Guitar, Clarinet, Keyboards
Carl Turney — Drums, Piano, Backing Vocals, Additional Percussion

References

External links
 Clinic official website

Clinic (band) albums
2008 albums
Domino Recording Company albums